Acteón is a 1965 Spanish drama film directed by Jorge Grau. It was entered into the 4th Moscow International Film Festival.

Cast
 Martin LaSalle as Acteón
 Pilar Clemens as Primera Mujer
 Juan Luis Galiardo as Joven
 Claudia Gravy as Segunda Mujer (as Claudia Gravi)
 Iván Tubau as Prestidigitador
 Nieves Salcedo as Mujer del Prestidigitador
 Virginia Quintana as Mujer en Metro
 Guillermo Méndez as General prusiano

References

External links
 

1965 films
1965 drama films
Spanish drama films
1960s Spanish-language films
Spanish black-and-white films
Films based on Metamorphoses
1960s Spanish films